Pseudobagrus is a genus of bagrid catfishes that inhabit streams and rivers throughout East Asia. About half of these species occur in China.

The two Coreobagrus species, C. brevicorpus and C. ichikiwai, are both treated in some recent literature as valid in Pseudobagrus. It has been noted that Pelteobagrus may not be monophyletic if species placed in Pseudobagrus and Coreobagrus were excluded. The taxonomy of this genus is unclear and many authorities treat it as a junior synonym of Tachysurus.

Pseudobagrus species are small- to mid-sized bagrid catfishes. These fish all have an inferior mouth; narial openings widely separated; four pairs of barbels; top of head covered by skin in most species; two dorsal fin spines; pelvic fin small; and caudal fin emarginate, truncate or round.

One fossil species, P. ikiensis Watanabe & Uyeno, is known from the Middle Miocene of Japan.

Species 
There are currently 32 recognized species in this genus:
 Pseudobagrus adiposalis Ōshima, 1919
 Pseudobagrus albomarginatus (Rendahl (de), 1928)
 Pseudobagrus analis (Nichols, 1930)
 Pseudobagrus aurantiacus (Temminck & Schlegel, 1846)
 Pseudobagrus brachyrhabdion J. L. Cheng, Ishihara & E. Zhang, 2008
 Pseudobagrus brevianalis Regan, 1908
 Pseudobagrus brevicaudatus (H. W. Wu, 1930)
 Pseudobagrus crassilabris (Günther, 1864)
 Pseudobagrus eupogoides H. W. Wu, 1930
 Pseudobagrus fui C. P. Miao, 1934
 Pseudobagrus gracilis Jie Li, X. L. Chen & B. P. L. Chan, 2005
 Pseudobagrus hwanghoensis (T. Mori, 1933)
 Pseudobagrus kaifenensis (T. L. Tchang, 1934)
 Pseudobagrus koreanus Uchida, 1990
 Pseudobagrus kyphus Đ. Y. Mai, 1978
 Pseudobagrus medianalis (Regan, 1904)
 Pseudobagrus microps (Rendahl (de), 1932)
 Pseudobagrus nubilosus H. H. Ng & Freyhof, 2007
 Pseudobagrus omeihensis (Nichols, 1941)
 Pseudobagrus ondon T. H. Shaw, 1930
 Pseudobagrus pratti (Günther, 1892)
 Pseudobagrus rendahli (Pellegrin & P. W. Fang, 1940)
 Pseudobagrus sinyanensis (T. S. Fu, 1935)
 Pseudobagrus taeniatus (Günther, 1873)
 Pseudobagrus taiwanensis Ōshima, 1919
 Pseudobagrus tenuifurcatus (Nichols, 1931)
 Pseudobagrus tenuis (Günther, 1873)
 Pseudobagrus tokiensis Döderlein (de), 1887
 Pseudobagrus trilineatus (C. Y. Zheng, 1979)
 Pseudobagrus truncatus (Regan, 1913)
 Pseudobagrus vachelli
 Pseudobagrus wangi C. P. Miao, 1934

References

 
Bagridae
Fish of Asia
Taxa named by Pieter Bleeker
Catfish genera